Marco Fiore (born 2 February 1989) is a German former professional footballer who played as a midfielder.

Club career

Early career
Born in Menden, Germany, Fiore graduated the youth academy of FC Schalke 04 in 2009. He joined fellow German outfit, SV Wilhelmshaven on a free transfer in July 2009. He made his debut for the club in a 2–2 home draw with Chemnitzer FC on 8 August 2009, and went on to make 26 league appearances for the club during the 2009–10 Regionalliga campaign, scoring one goal. After just one season with the club, Fiore transferred to Italian Lega Pro Seconda Divisione outfit, S.S. Milazzo in August 2010, in what was another free transfer. With the Sicilian outfit, Fiore made 27 appearances in his first season in Italy. He remained with the club for the 2011-12 campaign and made an additional 34 league appearances. In total, Fiore appeared in 61 domestic matches for Milazzo, scoring two goals before being sold to Serie A side, Catania in June 2012.

Calcio Catania
On 30 June 2012, Fiore officially transferred to Calcio Catania on a free transfer. Ahead of the 2012–13 Serie A campaign, Catania loaned Fiore to the Lega Pro Seconda Divisione with A.C. Bellaria on 30 August 2012. After just 14 league appearances (8 as a starter), Catania recalled the midfielder in January 2013, in order to loan him to U.S. Gavorrano, also of the Italian fourth division, for the remainder of the 2012–13 statistical season. Fiore scored 1 goal in 12 league matches for the club, before returning to Catania on 30 June 2013.

References

External links
 
 

1989 births
Living people
German footballers
German sportspeople of Italian descent
Association football midfielders
SV Wilhelmshaven players
U.S. Gavorrano players
Rot Weiss Ahlen players
Catania S.S.D. players
FC Viktoria Köln players
Regionalliga players